Scriptures is the eighth studio album by British death metal band Benediction, released on October 16, 2020 on Nuclear Blast. It is the band's first studio album in 12 years and marks the return of former vocalist Dave Ingram. Originally scheduled for May 2020, the album's release was pushed back to August due to the COVID-19 pandemic before being rescheduled again to October.

Three music videos were released, for the tracks "Rabid Carnality", "Stormcrow", and "Iterations of I" respectively.

Track listing

Personnel
Darren Brookes - guitar
Peter Rew - guitar
Dave Ingram - vocals
Dan Bate - bass
Giovanni Durst – drums

References 

2020 albums